I Am Dead is a puzzle adventure video game from independent British developer Hollow Pond. It was published by Annapurna Interactive on October 8, 2020 for Microsoft Windows and Nintendo Switch. Versions for PlayStation 4, PlayStation 5, Xbox One and Xbox Series X and Series S were released on August 9, 2021. The game follows Morris Lupton, a museum curator on the island of Shelmerston who recently died. Reunited with the ghost of his dog, Sparky, he discovers that a disaster is about to destroy the island. They both must uncover the ancient mysteries of Shelmerston and stop the island's volcano from erupting, saving the island. To do this, the player has the ability to see inside objects and people, revealing their contents and memories.

Reception 

I Am Dead was met by generally positive reviews, according to the review aggregator Metacritic.

Nintendo Lifes Stuart Gipp enjoyed the game's themes but criticized the writing and simplistic gameplay. "I Am Dead is an at times touching and generally thoughtful exploration of loss, grief and lasting memories that doesn’t quite resonate as much as it could due to some occasionally-too-twee writing and gameplay that doesn’t quite disguise the fact that it’s a glorified hidden object game."

Joe Skrebels of IGN felt mixed on the usage of I am Dead additional challenges, "The separation of the core story and those tougher challenges feels like something of a compromise from developer Hollow Ponds to me, an attempt to offer both an easygoing narrative and something for those who want to be tested, when both sides could perhaps be made more satisfying by combining them."

References

External links
 

2020 video games
Adventure games
Video games about ghosts
Indie video games
Puzzle video games
PlayStation 4 games
PlayStation 5 games
Xbox One games
Xbox Series X and Series S games
Windows games
Nintendo Switch games
Annapurna Interactive games
Single-player video games
Video games developed in the United Kingdom
Video games set in the United Kingdom
Video games set on fictional islands
Video games about death
Video games about dogs